The Best of Ken Mellons is an album, released in 2001, by American country music artist Ken Mellons. Despite its title, it is not a compilation album, but rather a studio album composed of nine new tracks and a dance mix of his 1994 hit "Jukebox Junkie". Prior to this album, Mellons had released a non-charting single in "Mr. DJ" for Curb, and after the release of this album, Mellons left the label.

Track listing
"Jukebox Junkie (Dance Mix)" (Ken Mellons, Jerry Cupit, Janice Honeycutt) – 4:40
"Shame on Me" (Mellons, Buddy Brock) – 3:07
"Home Team" (Mellons, Cupit, Lee Thomas Miller) – 3:54
"Farmer's Daughter" (Mellons, Cupit) – 2:29
"Ladies Night" (Mellons, Cupit, Randy Roberts) – 3:51
"Can You Feel It" (Mellons, Cupit, Jobe Memarie) – 3:21
"Down to a Crawl" (Mellons, Cupit, David Brewer, Faye Brewer) – 3:24
"Bundle of Nerves" (Mellons, Cupit, Miller) – 2:55
"Was It Good for You" (Mellons, Cupit) – 3:11
"Cool as You" (Larry Boone, Billy Lawson) – 2:58

Ken Mellons albums
2001 greatest hits albums
Curb Records compilation albums